David Heilbroner is an American director, producer and sound editor. Best known for producing Traffic Stop (2017) for which he received Academy Award for Best Documentary Short Subject nomination with wife Kate Davis at the 90th Academy Awards.

Filmography
 2021: Dionne Warwick: Don't Make Me Over (Documentary)
 2018: Say Her Name: The Life and Death of Sandra Bland (Documentary)
 2017: Traffic Stop (Documentary short) 
 2014: The Newburgh Sting (Documentary) 
 2013: The Cheshire Murders (TV Movie documentary) 
 2011: American Experience (TV Series documentary) 
 2010: Stonewall Uprising (Documentary) 
 2009: Waiting for Armageddon (Documentary)
 2006: Plastic Disasters (TV Movie documentary) 
 2006: Ten Days That Unexpectedly Changed America''' (TV Series documentary) 
 2005: Pucker Up (Documentary) 
 2004: Jockey (Documentary) 
 2000: American Babylon'' (Documentary)

References

External links
 

Living people
1950s births
American film producers
American film directors